Yang Junxuan (born 26 January 2002) is a Chinese swimmer. She competed at the 2018 Asian Games in the following competitions: 100 metre freestyle winning bronze in 54.17, 200 metre freestyle winning silver in 1:57.48, women's 4 × 100 metre freestyle relay winning the silver medal and 4 x 200 m freestyle relay winning gold. At the 2018 Summer Youth Olympics in Buenos Aires Yang won bronze in the 50 metre freestyle event in 25.47, silver in the 100 metre freestyle event in 54.43 and silver in the 200 metre freestyle event in 1:58.05, as well as gold in the 4 x 100 metre relay event (her time of 53.99 being the best of all participants) and gold in the mixed 4 x 100 metre medley relay event.

See also
List of Youth Olympic Games gold medalists who won Olympic gold medals

References

External links
 

  

2002 births
Living people
Chinese female freestyle swimmers
Swimmers from Shandong
Sportspeople from Zibo
Asian Games medalists in swimming
Asian Games gold medalists for China
Asian Games silver medalists for China
Asian Games bronze medalists for China
Swimmers at the 2018 Asian Games
Medalists at the 2018 Asian Games
Swimmers at the 2018 Summer Youth Olympics
Youth Olympic gold medalists for China
Swimmers at the 2020 Summer Olympics
Medalists at the 2020 Summer Olympics
Olympic gold medalists for China
Olympic silver medalists for China
Olympic gold medalists in swimming
Olympic silver medalists in swimming
World Aquatics Championships medalists in swimming
21st-century Chinese women